The 2009 Women's South American Volleyball Club Championship was the 2009 annual edition of the women's volleyball tournament, played by six teams from 3 countries over October 14–18, 2009 in Lima, Peru.

Competing clubs

Pool A

|}

|}

Pool B

|}

|}

Final round

Bracket

Semifinals

|}

5th place

|}

3rd place

|}

Final

|}

Final standing

Awards
MVP:  Jaqueline Carvalho (Sollys/Osasco)
Best Spiker:  Natalia Pereira (Sollys/Osasco)
Best Blocker:  Carol Gattaz (Unilever)
Best Server:  Danielle Lins (Unilever)
Best Setter:  Carolina Albuquerque (Sollys/Osasco)
Best Receiver:  Welissa Gonzaga (Sollys/Osasco)
Best Digger:  Camila Brait (Sollys/Osasco)
Best Libero:  Fabiana de Oliveira (Unilever)

References

International volleyball competitions hosted by Peru
South America Women's Club Championship
South America Women's Club Championship
Women's South American Volleyball Club Championship